Arthur Philip Stanhope, 6th Earl Stanhope (13 September 1838 – 19 April 1905), was a British Conservative Party politician. From 1855 to 1875 he was styled Viscount Mahon.

Career
He was a son of Philip Stanhope, 5th Earl Stanhope by his wife Emily Harriet Kerrison. As Viscount Mahon, he sat for a few months of 1868 as a Member of Parliament for Leominster and returned to the Commons as member for Suffolk East from 1870 to 1875. He was Chairman of the National Union of Conservative and Constitutional Associations in 1875.

Lord Mahon succeeded to the title of Earl Stanhope on the death of his father on 24 December 1875. He was appointed First Church Estates Commissioner in December 1878, and served as Lord Lieutenant of Kent from 1890 to 1905.

Family
He married Evelyn Pennefather, daughter of Richard Pennefather of Knockeevan, County Tipperary by his wife Lady Emily Butler, daughter of Richard Butler, 1st Earl of Glengall. They had two children:
James Richard Stanhope, 7th Earl Stanhope (1880–1967)
Capt. Hon. Richard Philip Stanhope (16 January 1885 – 15 September 1916), married Lady Beryl le Poer Trench (d. 1957), daughter of William Le Poer Trench, 5th Earl of Clancarty on 13 May 1914, without issue. He was killed at the Battle of Flers–Courcelette.

References

External links 
 

1838 births
1905 deaths
Earls Stanhope
Lord-Lieutenants of Kent
Conservative Party (UK) MPs for English constituencies
Mahon, Arthur Philip Stanhope, Viscount
Mahon, Arthur Philip Stanhope, Viscount 
Mahon, Arthur Philip Stanhope, Viscount
Mahon, Arthur Philip Stanhope, Viscount
Stanhope, E6
Members of the London School Board
Arthur
Conservative Party (UK) hereditary peers
Church Estates Commissioners